Reggie Barnes may refer to:
 Reggie Barnes (running back)
 Reggie Barnes (linebacker)
 Reggie Barnes (skateboarder)

See also
Sir Reginald Barnes, cavalry officer in the British Army